Lizbeth Rodríguez (born 22 May 1994), also known as Lizbeth Rodriguez la caza infieles, is a Mexican YouTuber and actress, and an ex member of the company Badabun, which distributes original viral content on YouTube and Facebook. She is known for hosting the YouTube channel's successful program, 'Exponiendo infieles' (Exposing cheaters), in which couples are offered money in exchange for letting her review the social media networks on their cell phones to determine how faithful the partners are.

As of May 2022, her personal YouTube channel has 9.02 million subscribers and she also has more than 11 million followers on Instagram and around 17 million followers on Facebook.

Biography 
Lizbeth Rodriguez was born on 22 May 1994, in Tijuana, Baja California, Mexico. She grew up with domestic violence in the family and decided to study theater at the age of 16. Without her family's support, however, she left home to live with a friend and start her career. To support herself, she worked in different jobs as a waitress and in a karaoke.

Career

Exponiendo infieles 
Rodriguez studied a degree in theater, where she met members of Badabun who invited her to join the company as a technical assistant. After meeting her, the executives of the chain decided to have her present the Badabun Exponiendo Infieles program in May 2018,  following a change of presenter. After Rodriguez took on this role, the program became, in a few short months, one of the most watched of the channel and the fastest growing in Spanish and Portuguese within the YouTube platform.

Personal life 
Rodriguez has a younger brother whom she helped raise. She was in a relationship with fellow Badabun presenter Tavo Betancourt. She has a son named Eros, and she introduced him for the first time on her social media accounts in August 2019.

Filmography

YouTuber

Awards and nominations

References

External links 
 Lizbeth Rodriguez on Youtube
 https://www.xnxx.com/video-16p0kcf7/lizbeth

Living people
1994 births
People from Tijuana
Mexican YouTubers
Spanish-language YouTubers
YouTube channels launched in 2018
Video bloggers
21st-century Mexican women writers
Mexican bloggers
Mexican women bloggers
Actresses from Baja California